Julian Murfett (2 July 1915 – 27 April 1982) was an Australian cricketer. He played twelve first-class matches for Tasmania between 1937 and 1948.

See also
 List of Tasmanian representative cricketers

References

External links
 

1915 births
1982 deaths
Australian cricketers
Tasmania cricketers
Cricketers from Tasmania